Real Man is a 1998 album by Billy Dean.

Real Man may also refer to:

"Real Man" (song), a song by Billy Dean from the same album
Real Man (TV series) a South Korean variety show
"Real Man", a song by Bonnie Raitt from her 1989 album Nick of Time
"Real Man", a song by Todd Rundgren from his 1975 album Initiation
"Real Man", a song by Bruce Springsteen from his 1992 album Human Touch
"Real Man", a song by Jolin Tsai from her 2009 album Butterfly
"Real Man", a song by Lexington Bridge from their 2007 album The Vibe

See also
A Real Man (disambiguation)